The 1952 United States Senate election in Wisconsin was held on November 4, 1952.

Incumbent Republican U.S. Senator Joseph McCarthy was elected to a second term in office over Democrat Thomas E. Fairchild. McCarthy did not complete his term; he died on May 2, 1957, and was succeeded by William Proxmire in a special election.

, this is the last time that the Republicans have won the Class 1 senate seat in Wisconsin.

Republican primary

Candidates
 Edward J. Finan
 Andrew G. Jacobson
 Edmund Kerwer
 Joseph McCarthy, incumbent Senator since 1947
 Leonard Schmitt, attorney and candidate for Governor in 1950
 Perry J. Stearns, candidate for Senate in 1944 and 1946

Results

Democratic primary

Candidates
 Thomas E. Fairchild, U.S. Attorney for the Western District of Wisconsin, former Wisconsin Attorney General, and nominee for Governor in 1950
 Henry S. Reuss, Milwaukee County prosecutor and former anti-McCarthy Republican

Results

General election

Candidates
 James E. Boulton (Socialist Labor)
 Alfred L. Easterday (Honest Government)
 Thomas E. Fairchild, U.S. Attorney for the Western District of Wisconsin (Democratic)
 Joseph McCarthy, incumbent Senator since 1947 (Republican)

Results

The 1952 race was much closer than McCarthy's 1946 victory, and he trailed Republican presidential candidate Dwight D. Eisenhower by around 100,000 votes in the state.

See also 
 1952 United States Senate elections
 McCarthyism

References 

1952
Wisconsin
United States Senate
Joseph McCarthy